Natasha is a 1974 Argentine drama film directed by Eber Lobato.

Cast
Thelma Stefani as Natasha
Enzo Viena
Edgardo Suárez
Rodolfo Salerno
Mónica Grey
Susana Juri
Iris Morenza
Lili Fitzner
María Lucero
Adrián Lobato

External links
 

1974 films
Argentine drama films
1970s Spanish-language films
1974 drama films
1970s Argentine films